Lawrence K. "Larry" Grooms (born March 20, 1964) is a Republican member of the South Carolina Senate, representing the 37th District. He serves as the Chairman of the Senate Transportation Committee since 2007.

Personal life
Grooms grew up in the small town of St. Stephen, South Carolina and after graduating from high school went on to receive a degree from Clemson University. He is married to Carol Grooms and is the father of three boys, Taylor, Hayden, and Jack. Currently, Senator Grooms resides in Bonneau, South Carolina.

Early career

After college, Grooms started a convenience store business, which he successfully expanded into a chain of gas stations throughout low-country South Carolina.

Political career
Grooms was first elected to the State Senate in 1997 as a Republican and has maintained a strongly conservative voting record throughout his tenure.

Senator Grooms is staunchly anti-abortion and in December 2020, filed Senate Bill 1, "The Heartbeat Bill," which prohibits abortions after a fetal heartbeat is detected. Planned Parenthood and others sued the State of South Carolina over the newly enacted law, and a preliminary injunction was issued the next day. In recognition of his efforts, Senator Grooms has been named Pro-Life Legislator of the Year by South Carolina Citizens for Life twice, in 2012 and in 2016.

Grooms is an advocate for school choice. He voted in support of a 2021 bill to establish "Schools of Innovation", which receive students irrespective of their places of residence. "This is bringing a little bit of free-market principles into the delivery of educational service. So, a School of Innovation can do something different," 

Grooms's bill, the REACH Act, became law in the spring of 2021. It requires public high school and universities to instruct students on America's founding documents, including the Constitution, Declaration of Independence, and Federalist Papers. "Somehow or another we got off course. Our public colleges shied away from teaching the Constitution and Declaration and what they mean. And it needs to be taught, it’s important," Senator Grooms said.

He firmly opposes same-sex marriage.

During a November 24, 2017, exchange with a constituent on Facebook, Grooms affirmed his support for Roy Moore's Alabama Senate campaign despite Moore's sexual abuse allegations.  During that exchange, Grooms said "I stand with Roy Moore," when asked to comment on the sexual allegations. In a later interview, Grooms qualified his answer, saying, "If the allegations are proved to be true, it would be a different story."

2010 gubernatorial candidacy

In May 2009, Grooms announced his candidacy for the Governor of South Carolina in the 2010 South Carolina gubernatorial election. In January 2010, he ended his campaign.

Notes and references

External links
Larry Grooms for Congress
South Carolina Legislature - Senator Larry Grooms official SC Senate website
Project Vote Smart - Senator :Larry Grooms(SC) profile
Follow the Money - Larry Grooms
2006 2004 2002 2000 campaign contributions

1964 births
Living people
Republican Party South Carolina state senators
People from St. Stephen, South Carolina
Clemson University alumni
21st-century American politicians